Glee: The Music, Season 4, Volume 1 is the thirteenth soundtrack album by the cast of the American musical television series Glee. It features 13 songs from the fourth season. It was released on November 27, 2012 through Columbia Records.

Background
The first soundtrack release for the show's fourth season, Glee: The Music, Season 4, Volume 1 features songs from the season premiere, "The New Rachel", through to the eighth episode, "Thanksgiving" (on the standard edition), or the ninth, "Swan Song" (on the deluxe edition). The deluxe edition, only released digitally, features vocals from recurring guest stars Kate Hudson and Sarah Jessica Parker. Although the album is titled "Volume 1", a second volume for Season 4 was never released.

Track listing

Personnel

Dianna Agron - vocals
Cheche Alara - composer
Josh Alexander - composer
Adam Anders – arranger, engineer, producer, soundtrack producer, vocals
Jack Antonoff - composer
Jacob Artist - vocals
Peer Åström – engineer, mixing, producer
Melissa Benoist - vocals
Guy Berryman - composer
Jeff Bhasker - composer
Paul Blair - composer
David Bowie - composer
Jonny Buckland - composer
busbee - composer
Geoff Bywater – executive in charge of music
C. Carson Parks - composer
Will Champion - composer
Chris Colfer - vocals
Darren Criss - vocals
Dante Di Loreto – executive producer
Andrew Dost - composer
Brian Eno - composer
Tommy Denander – Guitar
Brad Falchuk – executive producer
Carl Falk - composer
Fernando Garibay - composer
Alexander Geringas - composer
Stefani Germanotta - composer
Dean Geyer - vocals
Tyler Glenn - composer
Yoo Gun-hyung - composer
Bilal Hajji - composer
Topper Headon - composer
Greg Holden - composer
Scott Hoffman - composer
Kate Hudson - vocals
Enrique Iglesias - composer
Park Jae-sang - composer
Billy Joel - composer
Mick Jones - composer

AJ Junior - composer
Savan Kotecha - composer
Samuel Larsen- vocals
Brian Lee - composer
Ana Lynch - composer
Chris Martin - composer
Kevin McHale - vocals
Ben McKee - composer
Jayma Mays - vocals
Lea Michele - vocals
Cory Monteith - vocals
Heather Morris - vocals
Matthew Morrison - vocals
Ryan Murphy – producer, soundtrack producer
Alex Newell - vocals
Chord Overstreet - vocals
Tim Pagnotta - composer
Sarah Jessica Parker - vocals
Drew Pearson - composer
Ryan Peterson – engineer
Dean Pitchford - composer
Pitbull - composer
Daniel Platzman - composer
RedOne - composer
Dan Reynolds - composer
Naya Rivera - vocals
Nate Ruess - composer
Jason Sellards - composer
Wayne "Wing" Sermon - composer
Harry Shum Jr. - vocals
Paul Simon - composer
Paul Simonon - composer
Billy Steinberg - composer
Jim Steinman - composer
Joe Strummer - composer
Taylor Swift - composer
Becca Tobin - vocals
Jenna Ushkowitz - vocals
Rami Yacoub - composer

Charts

Weekly charts

Year-end charts

References

2012 soundtrack albums
Glee (TV series) albums